Lafayette University may mean:
 Lafayette College, a private liberal arts college in Easton, Pennsylvania, USA
 University of Louisiana at Lafayette
 Lafayette University, also known as Notre Dame de Lafayette University, a degree mill identified in Operation Dipscam

Educational institution disambiguation pages